U.S. Open pool championships and U.S. Open pocket billiards championships are generic terms that may refer to various professional pool tournaments, not all of them affiliated with each other. "U.S. Open Pocket Billiards Championship" as a proper noun most often refers to the straight pool (14.1 continuous pool) championship, the oldest of the events. Though "U.S. Open Pool Championship" as a stand-in for an official event name most commonly refers to the nine-ball event, it may, depending upon context, refer to any of six different annual tournaments, some of comparatively recent inception.

U.S. Open Nine-ball Championship

This long-running nine-ball tournament began at Q-Master Billiards in Norfolk, Virginia in 1976. It remains one of the most prestigious titles in pool. Since 2018, the tournament has been organised by Matchroom Pool

U.S. Open Straight Pool Championship
The U.S. Open Straight Pool Championship tournament has been held inconsistently over the last several decades and was a less prestigious tournament since 2000.

U.S. Open One-Pocket Championship

U.S. Open Ten-ball Championship

U.S. Open Eight-ball Championship

U.S. Open Bank Pool Championship

References

Pool competitions
 
U.S. Open